The Sotavento Islands (Portuguese: Ilhas de Sotavento, literally, the Leeward Islands) is the southern island group of the Cape Verde archipelago. There are four main islands. The western three islands, Brava, Fogo and Santiago, are rocky and volcanic agricultural islands, with the longest histories of human habitation. The fourth and easternmost island Maio is a flat desert island whose economy was primarily based on salt, giving it more in common with the Barlavento islands Sal and Boa Vista. The Ilhéus do Rombo are barren islets north of Brava.

See also
 Barlavento Islands
 List of islands of Cape Verde

References